Duero, officially the Municipality of Duero,  is a 4th class municipality in the province of Bohol, Philippines. According to the 2020 census, it has a population of 18,861 people.

It may have been named after the Douro (Duero) in the Iberian peninsula. Roman Catholicism was introduced to the town in 1860 by a Spanish priest. Duero was established as a municipality two years later, in 1862, and a convent was constructed in 1868.

The town of Duero, Bohol celebrates its fiesta on December 8, to honor the town patron Immaculate Conception.

Geography

Barangays
Duero comprises 21 barangays:

Climate

Demographics

Economy

Gallery

References

External links
 [ Philippine Standard Geographic Code]
 Municipality of Duero

Municipalities of Bohol
1862 establishments in the Philippines